Chrysauge is a genus of snout moths. It was described by Jacob Hübner in 1823.

Species
 Chrysauge bifasciata Walker, 1854
 Chrysauge catenulata Warren, 1891
 Chrysauge eutelia Druce, 1903
 Chrysauge flavelata (Stoll in Cramer & Stoll, 1781)
 Chrysauge kadenii Lederer, 1863
 Chrysauge latifasciata Warren, 1891
 Chrysauge unicolor Berg, 1876

References

Chrysauginae
Pyralidae genera